Oleksii Petrovych Poroshenko (born 6 March 1985) is a Ukrainian politician and diplomat. He is a former People's Deputy of Ukraine and is the son of former president Petro Poroshenko.

Education
Oleksii Poroshenko is the eldest son of former Ukrainian president Petro Poroshenko.

In 2002 he graduated from Klovsky Lyceum, Ukraine. From 2001 to 2002 he studied at Eton College in England. From 2002 to 2003 he studied at Winchester College. From 2002 to 2006 he studied at Taras Shevchenko National University of Kyiv, Institute of International Relations From 2004 to 2007 he studied at the London school of Economics. In 2008 he graduated from the Institute of International Relations and the London School of Economics. From 2011 to 2012 he studied at INSEAD business school (Diversity Fund Scholarship) in France and Singapore.

On 1 November 2018, Poroshenko was included in the Russian sanctions list in connection with Ukraine’s unfriendly actions towards citizens and legal entities of the Russian Federation.

Career

In 2006 Poroshenko worked at Merrill Lynch as an analyst.

In 2007 to 2009 he worked for the Confectionery Corporation in Roshen as an economist. In 2009, he became Sales Manager.

During 2009-2010 worked as an adviser in the Ministry of Economy of Ukraine.

From January to August 2010, he was Deputy Head of the trade and economic mission of the Consulate General of Ukraine in China. From August to September 2010 he was acting Deputy Head.

From September 2010 to June 2011 he was Vice-Consul of the Department of Economic Affairs at the Consulate General of Ukraine in Shanghai.

In October 2014, Poroshenko was elected Deputy of Ukraine from the Petro Poroshenko Bloc "Solidarity" in the single-mandate constituency №12 in the Vinnytsia region. According to the Central Election Commission, Poroshenko scored 64.04% or 62,359 votes of the electronic protocols of precinct commissions.

Poroshenko did not take part in the 2019 Ukrainian parliamentary election.

International activity
Head of the inter-parliamentary relations group with the Republic of Singapore.

Member of the Ukrainian delegation to the Inter-Parliamentary Union (IPU). On 11 April  2017  Oleksii Poroshenko speaking at a briefing in the Verkhovna Rada said that Ukraine boycotting the holding the Assembly of the inter-Parliamentary Union (IPU) in St. Petersburg and calls on other countries to do so.

Public activity
He was a representative in the regional parliament of Vinnytsia Oblast.

During his participation in the special operation in Donbass, Oleksii Poroshenko was listed under a different name for conspiracy (Anisenko). He was a mortar gunner and served under the Kramatorsk.

In August 2017 in Singapore, Oleksii Poroshenko completed an internship in public administration (Singapore Cooperation Programme). Singapore sponsored training courses
and study visits.

On 21 September 2018, according to the independent analytical platform VoxUkraine, according to the index of support for reforms, Poroshenko entered the top ten most effective people's deputies of the eighth session of the Verkhovna Rada of Ukraine of the eighth convocation, who supported the reform laws.

Legislative activity
Oleksii Poroshenko co-authored the draft law №3150 "on amending article 15 of the Law of Ukraine "on the status of war veterans, guarantees of their social protection" on strengthening the social protection of family members of the victims, adopted by the Verkhovna Rada of Ukraine on 2 February 2016. The bill provides for the abolition of absolutely unfair restrictions in the provision of benefits to the families of those who died defending Ukraine."

Oleksii Poroshenko became the author of a number of legislative initiatives. Among which:

Earnings
According to the electronic declaration, in 2015, Oleksii Poroshenko received ₴77,212 (US$3,227) as salary in the Verkhovna Rada. From the state budget, he was granted ₴80,559 compensation for expenses related to deputy activities. Poroshenko had the office in Vinnytsia with an area of 178.5 m², which at the time of acquisition (15 November 2013) cost ₴ 1.8 million (US$219,673). Together with his mother, Oleksii Poroshenko has an apartment in Kyiv with an area of 80.66 m². Poroshenko declared three cars: GAZ-14 (Chaika, produced in 1981), BMW 320i Cabrio (produced in 2011, the cost of ₴ 424.64 thousand), and Land Rover Discovery 4.0 (2013, the cost of ₴ 680.4 thousand). On the accounts in the International Investment Bank, Poroshenko had € 15 011, US$141 thousand, and €88 thousand. He also declared ₴ 187 thousand in cash.

In 2016, Poroshenko received ₴152,941 as salary in the Verkhovna Rada. On the accounts in the International Investment Bank, Oleksii Poroshenko had €11,900, US$95,600, and €82,100. He declared ₴317,200 in cash. His spouse, Julia Poroshenko, declared ₴82,988 as salary in the McKinsey & Company Ukraine. Income from insurance payments was ₴953,886. She had 138,879 euros in the bank account of BNP Paribas overseas. On the accounts in the International Investment Bank, Julia Poroshenko had €82,100 and US$95,600. She also had US$304,859 at the Citibank overseas.

Personal life
Oleksii Poroshenko is the son of Maryna Perevedentseva and Petro Poroshenko. He has two sisters, the twins Yevheniia and Oleksandra (born 2000), and a brother, Mykhailo (born 2001). Oleksii Poroshenko is married and has a son, born 7 June 2014.

Oleksii Poroshenko is depicted on one of the walls in a church located on the territory of his father's landholding in the VIP village of Kozyn (Koncha-Zaspa historic neighbourhood in the Holosiivskyi District of the city of Kyiv). The estate of Petro Poroshenko is located 13 kilometers from Kyiv along the Novoobuhovskaya highway. The fresco depicts the family of Poroshenko, including Petro Poroshenko with his wife Maryna and children Oleksii, Yevheniia, Oleksandra and Mykhailo. According to the Orthodox icon painter Dmitry Marchenko, the image is similar in terms of style to the paintings of the 19th century Russian painter Ivan Makarov, whose paintings include Emperor Alexander III with his family.

References

External links 
 Page on the website the Verkhovna Rada of Ukraine 
 Official Facebook page

1985 births
Living people
Politicians from Kyiv
Taras Shevchenko National University of Kyiv, Institute of International Relations alumni
Eighth convocation members of the Verkhovna Rada
21st-century Ukrainian politicians
People educated at Eton College
Eastern Orthodox Christians from Ukraine